Haslev, the largest town in Faxe municipality, lies in the southern part of Zealand, Denmark. About  from Copenhagen, it has a population of 12,119 (1 January 2022). 

Haslev has six public schools: two boarding schools, a folk high school, a technical school, a college of education, and a sixth-form college.

The estates and castles of Gisselfeld and Bregentved are close to Haslev.

History
Haslev started out being a small village named Hasle with a few houses and streets around the church. The name was changed to Haslev to avoid confusion with other similar town names in Denmark.

In 1870, the railway line passing Haslev town was inaugurated. At that time, Haslev had only 653 inhabitants. A street named Jernbanegade (Railway Street) was paved, to connect the church with the newly built train station. In the years that followed, the street became the main street of the town with shops, banks and so forth. In 1911, the town had 3,668 inhabitants. In the 1980s, a square in the middle of the street was constructed.

During the 20th century Haslev grew rapidly, becoming a center for the Church Association for the Inner Mission in Denmark. The latter built a folk high school, sixth-form college (with a boarding school) among others. In the 1970s and 1980s, the schools became independent of the founding association. Today, there are only few remains of the Inner Mission in Haslev.

In the early 1970s and onwards, an entrepreneur named Ole Christiansen founded whole new neighbourhoods of one-family houses with an attached garden at a low expense. This encouraged many families from all over Zealand, and especially Copenhagen, to move to Haslev.

Nobel-Prize winner Jens Christian Skou studied at Haslev Gymnasium (college) in his youth. In 1997, he received the Nobel Prize in Chemistry for his discovery of Na+,K+-ATPase

Prior to 1 January 2007, Haslev was a town in Haslev Municipality (kommune). On 1 January 2007 Haslev as the result of Kommunalreformen ("The Municipal Reform" of 2007), became a town in Faxe municipality.

Notable people 

 Carl Emil Moltke (1773 at Bregentved – 1858) a Danish diplomat and landowner
 Emilie Ulrich (1872 in Frerslev – 1952) a Danish soprano who sang leading roles at the Royal Danish Opera from 1894 until 1917
 Marianne Christiansen (born 1963 in Haslev) is a Lutheran Bishop in the Church of Denmark in the Diocese of Haderslev
 Jesper Bodilsen (born 1970 in Haslev) a Danish jazz double bassist
 Anders Egholm (born 1983 in Haslev) a Danish professional football defender, who plays for SønderjyskE
 Jonas Eika (born 1991) a Danish writer.

References

External links
Castles
 Bregentved estate and castle.
 Gisselfeld Castle and Monastery.

Schools
 Haslev Sixth Form College (Haslev Gymnasium & HF)
 Haslev College of Education (Haslev Seminarium) 
 The folk high school (Haslev Udvidede Hoejskole)

Public schools
 Groendalsskolen
 Lysholm Skole
 Nordskovskolen
 Sofiendalskolen 
 Svalebaekskolen
 Terslev Skole

Boarding schools
 Haslev Boarding School
 Haslev Boarding School for Sports

Municipal seats of Region Zealand
Municipal seats of Denmark
Cities and towns in Region Zealand
Faxe Municipality